"Date with the Night" is the first single from Fever to Tell by the Yeah Yeah Yeahs. This single also includes the B-side "Yeah! New York" which can also be found as a bonus track on the UK release of Fever to Tell, and an exclusive remix of "Bang" from their debut EP, Yeah Yeah Yeahs (2001).  The single peaked at number sixteen on the UK's official charts. The video, directed by Patrick Daughters, was, supposedly, shot at Bristol University Union's Anson Rooms on Saturday 1 March 2003 but also contains scenes shot at other venues during the same tour, including The Zodiac in Oxford. The song is also available as a downloadable track for the music video game series Rock Band. The song was also featured on the soundtrack for the British teen soap opera Skins and was used in an episode opening scene in the second season of Netflix's Daredevil.

Critical reception
"Date With the Night" was met with acclaim from music critics upon its release. In a review of the song, Allmusic's Tom Maginnis said that "the band scatter sinewy riffs laced with soiled power chords and volcanic eruptions of white noise with joyous irreverence." Blender noted that the song had a "disco pulse," while Entertainment Weekly's Emily Wilson called the song "ferocious." Pitchfork praised the song's "stop/start emergency-room shriek." The Guardian's review noted that "You scarcely notice how mannered the vocals are when there is great music powering away behind" Karen O.

Commercial Performance
The song debuted and peaked on the Official UK Singles Chart on the chart dated April 26, 2003, at number 16. It remains their highest-peaking single in the UK.

Track listing
CD & 7" Single
Date with the Night		
Yeah! New York		
Bang By Little Stranger

Charts

References

External links
 The Yeah Yeah Yeahs

2003 singles
Yeah Yeah Yeahs songs
2003 songs
Polydor Records singles
Interscope Records singles
Songs written by Karen O
Songs written by Brian Chase
Songs written by Nick Zinner